Smokin' Suckaz wit Logic was a hip-hop band from New York City active in the early 1990s.

Biography
The multi-ethnic band was formed in 1990 and consisted of G "Suave" (a rapper of Puerto Rican descent who earlier had appeared on a VHS entitled Ravenswood Nights freestyling over a beatbox with another rapper called King Sek), Darren "D-Smooth" Lolk (guitar), Money Mike (bass), Curtis "Mr." Watts (drums, keyboards, background vocals), Spank Dog (programming, scratches, background vocals), and Peter "Ajoe" Jorge  (programming, background vocals). They opened for Ziggy Marley and KRS-One, and released a single album, Playing' Foolz  on the Epic Records label. The group's influences included alternative, funk, reggae, jazz, and metal.

Due to creative differences over their musical style, the band disbanded in 1994. Most of the members went on to pursue solo careers. Mr. Watts became a producer and a solo artist, Suave became a Christian Rapper named "Rodan Tha Thinker" in a band called True 2 Life, D-Smooth went on to play Pete Townshend in The Who Show (A The Who Tribute band) and contribute to other punk and dub influenced rock bands, Money Mike became president of an air travel company called Airtech and the President of 420tours, the official tour operator and producer of the High Times Cannabis Cup; he also owned and operated High Times Records and had a distribution arrangement with EMI Caroline. He now runs Bambu Hostel in David, Panama, a backpackers' hostel. Ajoe continued to be a producer and would later produce albums for the likes of Big Daddy Kane and Sporty Thievz.

Discography 
Playin' Foolz 1993
Funk-A-Tac
Thingz Change
How We Hit 'Em
Cuz I'm Like Dat
B4 My Rhymez Thru
My Man Spank Dog
Playin' Foolz
Suckaz Tri 2 Play Me
Gangsta Story
Positive Vibez
He Can Save Your Soul
Jah Sent (CD only)
Herbalife
Uncle Tom Artist
Mutha Made 'Em

singles, EPS 
Mutha Made 'Em/B4 My Rhymes Thru
Mutha Made 'Em
Mutha Made 'Em (Instrumental)
B4 My Rhymes Thru
B4 My Rhymes Thru (Instrumental)

How We Hit 'Em
Cuz I'm Like Dat
B4 My Rhymez Thru
How We Hit 'em
 Mutha Made 'em
 Heat Up the M-16

Websites 
Curtis Watts Website
Fansite, includes lyrics, sample info, etc.
Bambu Hostel Website

American hip hop groups